Jyrki Aho (born July 14, 1974) is a Finnish former ice hockey defenceman and the current head coach for the French Hockey club of Grenoble, the Brûleurs de Loups.

References

1974 births
Living people
Finnish ice hockey coaches
Ässät coaches 
Finnish ice hockey defencemen
Sportspeople from Jyväskylä